Gardiye Punchihewage Amaraseela Silva was the 34th Chief Justice of Sri Lanka. He was appointed in 1973 succeeding Hugh Norman Gregory Fernando and was Chief Justice until 1974. He was succeeded by Victor Tennekoon.

References

Chief justices of Sri Lanka
Sinhalese judges
20th-century Sri Lankan people
People from British Ceylon
Acting Chief Justices of Ceylon